Neil Fitzwiliam is an English actor who has made several appearances in theatre, film and television productions.

In 1971, he was cast in the original London production of the musical Godspell at The Roundhouse, Chalk Farm, alongside David Essex, Julie Covington, Jeremy Irons and Marti Webb.

His other credits include the original London production of the Andrew Lloyd Webber musical Cats, based on the poems of T S Eliot, and a part as a dancer in the film, The Slipper and the Rose.

On television, his most notable role was Frank Weisel in first series of the BBC sitcom Yes Minister.

Following a car accident that resulted in a brain injury, he had to finish his acting career.

Filmography

External links 

 

English male film actors
English male television actors
English male stage actors
Year of birth missing (living people)
Living people
20th-century English male actors